Farewell (subtitled The Golden Jubilee Australian Farewell Tour 2013) is a live album by Australian band The Seekers. The album, released on CD and DVD captures the historic concert filmed in The Seekers' hometown of Melbourne in 2013.

Track listing
 "Come the Day"
 "I'll Never Find Another You"
 "A World of Our Own"
 "Love Is Kind, Love Is Wine"
 "The Water Is Wide"
 "When Will the Good Apples Fall"
 "The Olive Tree" 
 "Silver Threads and Golden Needles"
 "Morningtown Ride"
 "Myra"
 "I Am Australian"
 "Someday One Day"
 "When the Stars Begin to Fall"
 "You're My Spirit"
 "Walk with Me"
 "Guardian Angel"
 "Louisiana Man"
 "Colours of My Life"
 "Red Rubber Ball"
 "Georgy Girl"
 "Keep a Dream in Your Pocket"
 "The Carnival Is Over"

Charts

Weekly charts

Year-end charts

Release history

References

Live albums by Australian artists
Sony Music Australia albums
The Seekers albums
2019 live albums
Decca Records live albums